Demie-Jade Resztan (born 28 December 1996) is an English boxer.

She won a medal at the 2019 AIBA Women's World Boxing Championships.

References

External links 

1996 births
Living people
English women boxers
AIBA Women's World Boxing Championships medalists
Light-flyweight boxers
Boxers at the 2022 Commonwealth Games
Commonwealth Games silver medallists for England
Commonwealth Games medallists in boxing
Medallists at the 2022 Commonwealth Games